|}

The Oaks Stakes is a Group 1 flat horse race in Great Britain open to three-year-old fillies. It is run at Epsom Downs over a distance of 1 mile, 4 furlongs and 6 yards (2,420 metres), and it is scheduled to take place each year in late May or early June.  It is the second-oldest of the five Classic races, after the St Leger. Officially the Cazoo Oaks, it is also popularly known as simply The Oaks. It has increasingly come to be referred to as the Epsom Oaks in both the UK and overseas countries, although 'Epsom' is not part of the official title of the race.)

It is the third of Britain's five Classic races to be held during the season, and the second of two restricted to fillies. It can also serve as the middle leg of the Fillies' Triple Crown, preceded by the 1000 Guineas and followed by the St Leger, although the feat of winning all three is rarely attempted.

History
The event is named after The Oaks, an estate located to the east of Epsom which was leased to the 12th Earl of Derby in the 18th century. He and his guests devised the race during a party at the estate in 1778. It was first run (as the Oakes Stakes) in 1779, one year before the introduction of the Derby Stakes. The inaugural winner, Bridget, was owned by Lord Derby himself.

The Oaks subsequently became one of Britain's leading events for three-year-olds. By the mid-1860s, the five leading events for this age group were referred to as "Classics". The concept was later adopted in many other countries.

European variations of the Oaks include the Irish Oaks, the Preis der Diana, the Prix de Diane and the Oaks d'Italia. Other national equivalents include the AJC Oaks, the New Zealand Oaks and the Yushun Himba.

Since 1892, horses have each carried 9 stone in the race.  Prior to this, there were several fluctuations, from an original 8 stone 4 pounds, down to 8 stone, then progressively upwards.

During both World Wars the race was run at Newmarket under the title the New Oaks Stakes. The 2014 running incorporated the name of Sir Henry Cecil in its title. Cecil, who died in June 2013, trained eight Oaks winners between 1985 and 2007.

Records
Leading jockey (9 wins):
 Frank Buckle – Nike (1797), Bellissima (1798), Bellina (1799), Scotia (1802), Theophania (1803), Meteora (1805), Neva (1817), Corinne (1818), Zinc (1823)
Leading trainer (13 wins):
 Robert Robson – Scotia (1802), Pelisse (1804), Meteora (1805), Briseis (1807), Morel (1808), Maid of Orleans (1809), Music (1813), Minuet (1815), Landscape (1816), Corinne (1818), Pastille (1822), Zinc (1823), Wings (1825)
Leading owner (9 wins): (includes part ownership)
 Susan Magnier – Shahtoush (1998), Imagine (2001), Alexandrova (2006), Was (2012), Minding (2016), Forever Together (2018), Love (2020), Snowfall (2021), Tuesday (2022)
Fastest winning time (at Epsom)

 Love (2020), 2m 34.06s

Widest winning margin

 Snowfall (2021), 16 lengths

Longest odds winners

 Vespa (1833), Jet Ski Lady (1991) and Qualify (2015)

Shortest odds winner – 8/100

 Pretty Polly (1904)

Most runners

 26, in 1848

Fewest runners

 4, in 1799 and 1904

Winners

See also
 Horse racing in Great Britain
 List of British flat horse races
 Trial races for the Epsom Oaks

References

 
 
 Paris-Turf:
 Racing Post:

External links
 The Epsom Oaks
  The Oaks Stakes.
 Oaks
 Oaks Stakes – Epsom Downs
  Epsom Oaks Stakes.

Flat races in Great Britain
Epsom Downs Racecourse
Flat horse races for three-year-old fillies
Sport in Surrey
Recurring sporting events established in 1779
1779 establishments in England
British Champions Series